Michael John Antonini  (born August 6, 1985) is a  former professional baseball pitcher.

He played ball at Cardinal O'Hara High School, Georgia College & State University and Gloucester County College. He was originally drafted by the Philadelphia Phillies in the 41st round of the 2006 MLB Draft but did not sign and was then drafted by the New York Mets in the 18th round of the 2007 MLB Draft.

Career

Minor League Baseball

New York Mets
Antonini signed with the Mets in 2007 and made his professional debut with their rookie league team, the Kingsport Mets, that year. After a few starts he was promoted to the Brooklyn Cyclones. He split 2008 between the Savannah Sand Gnats and the St. Lucie Mets. He spent most of 2009 with the AA Binghamton Mets, where he was 7–5 with a 5.32 ERA in 25 appearances (20 starts). In 2010, he was 6–9 with a 4.32 ERA in 23 starts for Binghamton and received a promotion to the AAA Buffalo Bisons where he started six games late in the year and was 2–3 with a 5.11 ERA.

Los Angeles Dodgers
Antonini was traded to the Los Angeles Dodgers on December 27, 2010, for Chin-lung Hu. With the Dodgers organization in 2011, he made 27 starts for the AA Chattanooga Lookouts and was 10–9 with a 4.01 ERA. He played in the mid-season Southern League All-Star Game and was added to the Dodgers' 40-man roster after the season to protect him from the Rule 5 Draft.

Antonini was promoted to the AAA Albuquerque Isotopes to start 2012. On April 24, he was called up to the major leagues for the first time when Matt Guerrier was placed on the disabled list; however, Antonini was optioned back to the minors on April 27 without appearing in any games. On May 28, he was again called up to replace the injured Ted Lilly, but returned to AAA one day later, again without appearing in a game. He was designated for assignment by the Dodgers on July 31, and removed from their 40-man roster. Because Antonini has spent time on an active MLB roster without ever appearing in an MLB game (to date), he is an example of a "phantom ballplayer." Antonini cleared waivers and was outrighted to the Isotopes. He pitched in 30 games in Albuquerque, including 13 starts, and finished the season 2–7 with a 5.71 ERA. He was released at the end of March 2013.

Los Angeles Angels
During 2015, Antonini was briefly with the Arkansas Travelers, the AA affiliate of the Los Angeles Angels. In four games (all starts) he had a 1–1 record with 4.95 ERA.

Independent leagues

Atlantic League
Antonini signed with the Camden Riversharks of the Atlantic League of Professional Baseball for 2013. He appeared in 13 games (one start) with an 0–1 record and 7.84 ERA.

Can-Am League
Antonini played with the New Jersey Jackals of the Canadian American Association of Professional Baseball in 2014. He broke the Can-Am League record for most strikeouts in a game with 15 on July 12, 2014, against the Lincoln Saltdogs. For the season, he played in 19 games (all starts) with a 9–3 record and 2.84 ERA.

Second stint in Atlantic League
During 2015 and 2016, Antonini was with the Bridgeport Bluefish; during those two seasons he made a combined 28 appearances (all starts) with an 8–12 record and 3.43 ERA.

He signed with the Somerset Patriots in 2017, and re-signed with the Patriots for the 2018 and 2019 seasons.

Mexican League
On July 12, 2019, Antonini's contract was purchased by the Pericos de Puebla of the Mexican League. He was released on September 2, 2019.

Third stint in Atlantic League
On September 3, 2019, Antonini re-signed with the Somerset Patriots of the Atlantic League of Professional Baseball. He became a free agent following the season.

References

External links

Living people
1985 births
Kingsport Mets players
Brooklyn Cyclones players
Savannah Sand Gnats players
St. Lucie Mets players
Binghamton Mets players
Buffalo Bisons (minor league) players
Chattanooga Lookouts players
Albuquerque Isotopes players
Camden Riversharks players
New Jersey Jackals players
Liga de Béisbol Profesional Roberto Clemente pitchers
Leones de Ponce players
Indios de Mayagüez players
Cangrejeros de Santurce (baseball) players
Bridgeport Bluefish players
Arkansas Travelers players
Tiburones de La Guaira players
Somerset Patriots players
Naranjeros de Hermosillo players
American expatriate baseball players in Mexico
Pericos de Puebla players
People from Drexel Hill, Pennsylvania